Luluabourg Province was created in 1962 from Kasai province. It was named after its main city, Luluabourg, which is now known as Kananga. It was incorporated into Kasai-Occidental Province in 1966 under the Mobutu regime.
Presidents (from 1965, governors) of Luluabourg province were
 September 1962 – September 1963, François Luakabwanga (1st time)
 September 1963 – 25 September 1964,  André Lubaya   (d. 1968)
 25 September 1964 – December 1965,  François Luakabwanga (2nd time)
 January – 18 April 1966,  Constantin Tshilumba
 18 – 25 April 1966,  François Luakabwanga (3rd time)

See also
 Lulua Province (proposed)

Former provinces of the Democratic Republic of the Congo (pre-1966)